"Eagle Rock" is the debut single by Australian rock band Daddy Cool, released in 1971 on the Sparmac record label. It went on to become the best-selling Australian single of the year, achieving gold status in eleven weeks, and remaining at No. 1 on the national charts for a (then) record ten weeks. "Eagle Rock" also spent 17 weeks at the No. 1 spot on the Melbourne Top 40 Singles Chart. The song was re-released by Wizard Records in 1982, and reached No. 17 on the Australian singles chart.

In New Zealand, the song has charted three times. In 1971 it reached No. 17, in 1986 it was in the charts for ten weeks, reaching No. 19, and in 1990 it was No. 1 for four weeks, staying in the charts for 15 weeks and achieving gold status.

Guitarist, vocalist and the song's writer Ross Wilson was living and performing in London when he wrote the song. He explained his inspiration for the song:

"Eagle Rock" was a 1920s black dance performed with the arms outstretched and the body rocking from side to side. "Doing the eagle rock" is also a metaphor for sexual intercourse. The 1913 song "Ballin' the Jack" has the line "Stretch your lovin' arms straight out in space / Then do the Eagle Rock with style and grace".

The accompanying promotional video, directed by Chris Löfvén, shows the band in locations around Melbourne.

In May 2001, Australasian Performing Right Association (APRA) celebrated its 75th anniversary by naming the Best Australian Songs of all time, as decided by a 100-strong industry panel, "Eagle Rock" was declared second behind the Easybeats' "Friday on My Mind".

In 2010, "Eagle Rock" was added to the National Film and Sound Archive's Sounds of Australia registry.

In January 2018, as part of Triple M's "Ozzest 100", the 'most Australian' songs of all time, "Eagle Rock" was ranked number 21.

Influence 
English musician Elton John toured Australia during 1972 and was so inspired by "Eagle Rock" that, with lyricist Bernie Taupin, he wrote "Crocodile Rock". The cover of John's 1973 album Don't Shoot Me I'm Only the Piano Player, which featured "Crocodile Rock", has a photo of Taupin wearing a "Daddy Who?" promotional badge. Taupin is also seen wearing Daddy Cool memorabilia on albums Tumbleweed Connection and Honky Chateau.

In 1998, Australia Post issued a special-edition set of twelve stamps celebrating the early years of Australian Rock 'n' Roll, featuring Australian hit songs of the late 1950s, the 1960s and the early 1970s. One of the songs featured in the collection was "Eagle Rock".

In 2005, it appeared as backing music on commercials for "Victoria - The Place to Be". It was also used in the opening scenes of the 2005 horror movie Wolf Creek, in the 2011 Australian film Red Dog and in the television series Dossa and Joe.

Since the early 1990s, "Eagle Rock" has been played at home games for the Sydney-based Manly-Warringah Sea Eagles rugby league team and is unofficially the club's theme song. The song was also played to the crowd after Manly's Grand Final wins in 2008 and 2011. Ross Wilson actually performed the song as part of the pre-game entertainment at the 1996 ARL Grand Final in which Manly won their 6th rugby league premiership.

The song is also played at West Coast Eagles games at Optus Stadium in the Australian Football League and the Eagles' Rick 'The Rock' Eagle mascot character is also named after the song. The song was also played at the MCG after the Eagles victory in the 2018 AFL Grand Final.

Tradition 
The song is also the basis of a tradition practiced among a small group of Australians for decades. Whenever the song is played at an event or a public bar, they (particularly the males) congregate on the dance floor where they unstrap their belts and hobble around singing the song with their trousers around their ankles.  
Ross Wilson of Daddy Cool, although perplexed about the origin of the practice has observed,'... I suppose it's got the silliness that was part of the charm of Daddy Cool.'

It is commonly attributed to a group of mining engineering students, who at the time were residents of St John's College within the University of Queensland campus. St John's has had the eagle as its mascot since its founding in the early 20th century which lends support to their claim that they began the practice. In "St Leo's, the memory" (1992) by Michael A. Head, the author comments on the heated confrontations that occurred during his time at St Leo's college (a neighbouring residential college) between the residents of each college relating to this issue.

The Clubs and Societies manual for the University of Queensland, has "Founders of the Eagle Rock Tradition" noted with the information for the UQ Mining and Metallurgy Association (MAMA).

In 2010, Ross Wilson played at the UQ Union Oktoberfest event and prior to performing the Eagle Rock, thanked "UQ Engineers" for coming up with the tradition. In 2011, in a pre-recorded video message to the attendees of the UQ Engineering Undergraduate Society Ball, he also credited "UQ Engineering Students" as founding the tradition.

The policy of the University of Queensland's Student Union states that no individual can be removed from the university pub, the Red Room, for dropping their pants whilst "Eagle Rock" is being played.

Video

The promotional film clip for "Eagle Rock" was shot on 16mm black-and-white film in 1971 by 23-year-old Melbourne filmmaker Chris Löfvén. It shows the band in Melbourne locations including South Melbourne, St. Kilda's Aussie Burger Bar opposite Luna Park and live shots from the 1971 Myponga Festival held in South Australia.

A rarely seen experimental colourised version of the film clip was found and restored by the National Film and Sound Archive of Australia (NFSA). in 2013.

The newly discovered version features a 37-second section using colour filters printed onto colour film stock. This particular print, though never intended for screening, was possibly seen by teenage audiences of 0-10 Network (now Network Ten) pop music program Happening 71 throughout 1971.

Track listing
All tracks written by Ross Wilson unless otherwise indicated.

7-inch vinyl
 "Eagle Rock" – 4:09
 "Bom Bom" (Ross Wilson, Ross Hannaford) – 2:33

12-inch vinyl
 "Eagle Rock – 4:07
 "Daddy Rocks Off" – 4:34
 "Bom Bom" (Wilson, Hannaford) – 2:34

Charts

Weekly charts

Year-end charts

Certifications

Personnel
Daddy Cool members
 Wayne Duncan – bass guitar, backing vocals
 Ross Hannaford – lead guitar, backing vocals
 Ross Wilson – lead vocals, guitar, harmonica
 Gary Young – drums, backing vocals

Additional personnel
 Robie Porter – piano, steel guitar
 Jeremy Noone – saxophone (later became a member of Daddy Cool)
 Dave Brown – horn

Additional credits
 Robie Porter – producer
 Roger Savage – engineer

Parodies
Australian comedian and singer Kevin Bloody Wilson wrote a parody of the song, "Me Beer's Cut Off", for his 2009 album Excess All Areas.

References

External links
 Listen to a clip of "Eagle Rock" and read more about the song on Australianscreen online
 "Majestic Fanfare" was added to the Sounds of Australia registry in 2010

1971 songs
1971 debut singles
APRA Award winners
Number-one singles in Australia
Number-one singles in New Zealand
Daddy Cool (band) songs
Songs written by Ross Wilson (musician)
Wizard Records singles